Connecticut's 130th House of Representatives district elects one member of the Connecticut House of Representatives. It encompasses parts of Bridgeport and has been represented by Democrat Antonio Felipe since 2019.

Recent elections

2020

2019 special

2018

2016

2014

2012

References

130